Tongxu County is a county in the east-central part of Henan province, China. It is under the administration of Kaifeng city.

Administrative divisions
As 2012, this county is divided to 6 towns and 6 townships.
Towns

Townships

Climate

References

County-level divisions of Henan
Kaifeng